City Centre Dhaka is a skyscraper located in Motijheel, Dhaka, and is the tallest building in Bangladesh. It topped-out in 2012, and since is the tallest building in both Dhaka and Bangladesh. It has 37 floors, ten of which are devoted to parking.

Facilities

City Centre Dhaka is the first building in Bangladesh to offer multistory car parking.
The building houses a small indoor convention center and recreational area, as well as a wide atrium filled with greenery. The building is constructed for commercial use but is open to the public. City Centre features 'Glasshouse', a premier restaurant open to the city. There is a Krispy Kreme store at ground floor.

See also
 List of tallest buildings in Bangladesh
 List of tallest buildings in Dhaka
 List of tallest buildings and structures in the Indian subcontinent
 List of tallest buildings and structures in the world by country

References

External links
 
 City Centre Bangladesh

Buildings and structures in Dhaka
Skyscraper office buildings in Bangladesh
Motijheel Thana
Office buildings completed in 2012
Central business districts in Bangladesh
Economy of Dhaka
2012 establishments in Bangladesh